Látrabjarg is a promontory and the westernmost point in Iceland. The cliffs are home to millions of birds, including  puffins, northern gannets, guillemots and razorbills. It is vital for their survival as it hosts up to 40% of the world population for some species such as of the razorbill. It is Europe's largest bird cliff, 14 km long and up to 440 m high.

Gallery

See also 
 Bjargtangar
 Bjargtangar Lighthouse

References

External links 
 Latrabjarg
 Látrabjarg, Gallery from islandsmyndir.is

Westfjords
Bird cliffs of Iceland
Tourist attractions in Iceland